Neck is a village in the northwest Netherlands. It is located in the municipality of Wormerland, North Holland, about 3 km west of Purmerend.

The village was first mentioned in 1328 as "sic: van Hicke", and means "neck" which refers to the narrowest point of the waterway separating the Beemster from the Wormer.

The polder mill Nekkermolen dates from 1631. In 1878, a pumping station was installed, but the wind mill has remained in service to this day to lend a hand, because the water in the polder rises fast during a storm.

References

Populated places in North Holland
Wormerland